The Ministry of Education, Science and Technology is a governmental body of Nepal responsible for the overall development of education in Nepal. The ministry is responsible for formulating educational policies and plans and managing and implementing them across the country through the institutions under it. In 2018, under the second Oli cabinet, the portfolio of the ministry was enlarged and the portfolios of Science and Technology were added to the then Ministry of Education, while the Ministry of Science and Technology was discontinued. The ministry is currently headed by the Prime Minister himself.

Former Ministers of Education
This is a list of all ministers of Education since the Nepalese Constituent Assembly election in 2013:

See also
 Gender inequality in Nepal
 Human rights in Nepal
 List of schools in Nepal
 List of engineering colleges in Nepal (intake capacity of engineering colleges)
 List of universities and colleges in Nepal

References

Education
Nepal
1951 establishments in Nepal